Subhash Chandra Bose Aapda Prabandhan Puraskar  is an Indian National Award for disaster management those who served selfless service for the country. Every individuals and organisations awarded by the Government Of India on every year on January 23, the birth anniversary of freedom fighter Netaji Subhash Chandra Bose. 

Gujarat Institute of Disaster Management (GIDM) selected in Institutional Category and Vice Chairman of Sikkim State Disaster Management Authority's, Vinod Sharma have been selected in Individual Category for the Subhash Chandra Bose Aapda Prabandhan Puraskar 2022 for his strategic work in disaster management.

History 
The award was instituted on the 125th birth anniversary of Netaji Subhash Chandra Bose to recognise and honour the invaluable contribution and selfless service rendered by individuals and organisations in India in the field of disaster management.
According to the Ministry of Home Affairs statement, Gujarat Institute of Disaster Management (GIDM) and Professor Vinod Sharma was honoured “for their excellent work and Those who were selected in 2019, 2020 and 2021 also received the award on the birth ceremony of Subhas Chandra Bose on Sunday 23 January 2022 By Prime Minister of India Narendra Modi.

Awardees
Details of Subhash Chandra Bose Aapda Prabandhan Award are as given below:

See also
 Orders, decorations, and medals of India

References

Indian awards
Government of India
Ministry of Home Affairs (India)
Emergency management in India
Acts of the Parliament of India 2005

External links